New York State Route 421 (NY 421) is a short state highway located within Adirondack Park in the southeastern corner of St. Lawrence County, New York, in the United States. It is a narrow, two-lane spur route connecting NY 30 to Horseshoe Lake by way of Tupper Lake. A dead end sign is posted immediately off NY 30, the only route with which it intersects. The entire road is located in the town of Piercefield, although that name is not posted on NY 421. The route offers access to several picnic and snowmobile areas.

The eastern portion of NY 421 was built in the 1920s under the terms of a 1923 law authorizing the construction of a highway leading from modern NY 30 north to Warren Point. This road was completed in 1925. NY 421 was assigned to the entirety of the north–south highway . The roadway connecting Horseshoe Lake to Tupper Lake was built  and became part of NY 421 by 1968. NY 421's former routing to Warren Point remained a state highway up through 1999, when a bill permitting the New York State Department of Transportation (NYSDOT) to remove it from the state highway system was signed into law.

Route description

NY 421 begins at a dead end south of the hamlet of Horseshoe in an isolated part of the town of Piercefield. Here, the highway connects to a pair of dirt roads, one of which leads north alongside Horseshoe Lake to Horseshoe. The two-lane route heads eastward from the trails, following the southern shore of Horseshoe Lake while traversing the deep woods of Adirondack Park. At the southeastern end of the lake, NY 421 turns northeastward, crossing a small stream feeding into the lake before curving back toward the east. For the next , the road passes through unabated wilderness as it heads toward the western shoreline of Tupper Lake.

At Tupper Lake, the route serves a cluster of recreational buildings at its intersection with Warren Point Road, a private drive leading to Warren Point. Here, NY 421 turns southward, running along the lake shore to nearby Paradise Point Road, which leads east to Paradise Point and the lakeside Veterans' Mountain Camp. After Paradise Point Road, the highway follows a winding, southeasterly course along Tupper Lake, passing little more than dense forests while crossing over the Bog River near its mouth. NY 421 follows the lake to its southern tip, where the route ends at an intersection with NY 30 just west of the St. Lawrence–Franklin county line.

History

In 1923, the New York State Legislature passed a law authorizing the construction of a highway connecting Route 24 (an unsigned legislative route that is now part of NY 30) to the new Veterans' Mountain Camp, an American Legion camp on Tupper Lake. The work was funded through appropriations defined in the law. The beginning of a state road to the camp came in 1924 when earth movers were brought in by the Harnathy Contracting Company, with construction beginning in early June. The project would include construction of a concrete bridge over the Bog River. However, Hanrathy was unable to finish the job as it went bankrupt, and a second firm, the Spadaccini Realty Construction Corporation of The Bronx was brought into finish the job, which began in June 1925. The bridge over the Bog River was completed on August 29, 1925 and they announced would be opened for traffic within ten days. The route finally opened in 1925, with the Veterans Camp opening on May 15, 1926. This road was extended from modern NY 30 north to a dead end at Warren Point. In the 1930 renumbering of state highways in New York, hundreds of state-maintained highways that did not yet have a designation were assigned one. The Veterans' Mountain Camp highway was designated as NY 421 by the following year.

A highway leading westward from NY 421 southwest of Warren Point to Horseshoe Lake was completed . It became part of an extended NY 421 by 1968. At the time, NY 421's western terminus was located at a railroad crossing in the isolated hamlet of Horseshoe, situated at the northwestern corner or Horseshoe Lake. The former routing of NY 421 north to Warren Point, legislatively designated as State Highway 9106B, was initially considered a spur of NY 421; it was later redesignated as NY 971D, an unsigned reference route.

After the Veterans' Mountain Camp was closed in the 1960s, the property was sold off to private owners, turning NY 971D into little more than a private drive. Thus, the road saw little use, handling less than 10 vehicles per day on average. As a result, the New York State Department of Transportation (NYSDOT) no longer considered the highway worthy of inclusion in the state highway system and began to take steps to remove the highway from the system. On February 22, 1999, NYSDOT sent a memorandum to the New York State Senate that laid out the groundwork for a bill which, if passed, would allow NYSDOT to remove NY 971D from the state highway system once it was able to transfer ownership and maintenance of the highway to another entity. A bill based on the memo was introduced in the State Senate on March 29 and eventually passed by the Senate and the New York State Assembly. The bill was signed into law by Governor George Pataki on July 27, 1999. The former routing of NY 971D is now officially a private drive.

Major intersections

See also

References

External links

NY Route 421 to Horseshoe Lake

421
Transportation in St. Lawrence County, New York